İske Coğıp is a rural locality (a derevnya) in Atninsky District, Tatarstan. The population was 162 as of 2010.

Geography 
İske Coğıp is located 27 km north of Olı Ätnä, district's administrative centre, and 95 km northeast of Qazan, republic's capital, by road.

History 
The village was established in 17th century.

From 18th to the first half of the 19th centuries village's residents belonged to the social estate of state peasants.

By the beginning of the twentieth century, village had a mosque and 2 small shops.

Before the creation of the Tatar ASSR in 1920 was a part of Çar Uyezd of Qazan Governorate. Since 1920 was a part of Arça Canton; after the creation of districts in Tatar ASSR (Tatarstan) in Tuqay (1930–1935), Tuqay (former Qızıl Yul) (1935–1963), Arça (1963–1990) and Ätnä districts.

References

External links 
 

Rural localities in Atninsky District